Citizen Cyborg: Why Democratic Societies Must Respond to the Redesigned Human of the Future is a 2004 non-fiction book by bioethicist and sociologist James Hughes, which articulates democratic transhumanism as a socio-political ideology and program.

The editors of the popular science magazine Scientific American recommended Citizen Cyborg in their April 2005 issue.

See also
Bioconservatism
Democratic transhumanism
Gattaca argument
Gattaca critical reception
Libertarian transhumanism

References

External links
Google Books: Citizen Cyborg
Citizen Cyborg References and Resources by Chapter

Reviews
Citizen Cyborg Reviews
Forman, Frank. Transhumanism's Vital Center. Journal of Evolution and Technology (April 2005). Retrieved on 2011-07-07
Doctorow, Cory. Humanist transhumanism: Citizen Cyborg. Boing Boing (11 April 2005). Retrieved on 2011-07-07
Ford, Alyssa. Humanity: The Remix. Utne Reader (May/June 2005) . Retrieved on 2011-07-07
Bailey, Ronald. Trans-Human Expressway. Reason (11 May 2005). Retrieved on 2011-07-07
Cave, Stephen; Cave, Friederike von Tiesenhausen. The most dangerous idea on earth?, Financial Times (27 May 2005). Retrieved on 2011-07-07
Arrison, Sonia. Future Humans. TechNewsWorld (6 October 2005). Retrieved on 2011-07-07

2004 non-fiction books
Bioethics
Futurology books
Social philosophy
Transhumanist books